Degimai ('burnt places' in Lithuanian) could refer to several Lithuanian villages:
Degimai, Josvainiai, in Josvainiai Eldership of Kėdainiai District Municipality
 Degimai, Krakės, in Krakės Eldership of Kėdainiai District Municipality
 Degimai, Kretinga, in Kretinga District Municipality
 Degimai, Mažeikiai, in Mažeikiai District Municipality
 Degimai, Naujoji Ūta, in Naujoji Ūta Eldership of Prienai District Municipality
 Degimai, Veiveriai, in Veiveriai Eldership of Prienai District Municipality
 Degimai, Šilalė, in Šilalė District Municipality.